Danylo Nechai (or Nechaj. Also Danila or Danilo. In cyrillic Нечай, Ничай, Нечаї) (November 1, 1612 – February 10, 1651) was a Ukrainian Cossack military commander and activist, a leader during the Cossack-Polish War, Colonel of Bratslav in Podolia from 1648–51 and the brother of  Nechai Ivan. He is known as a leader in the fight for Ukrainian independence.

 

Nechai is thought to have been born in the Podolian town Bar to a noble family. His father was likely Stefan (Stepan), a Ruthenian Orthodox Nobleman from Mstislav region (eastern Belaruss), who moved to Kyiv region and then to Bratslav. Stefan was married to Anna Petrovna Nevmyritsky, daughter of Peter Fedorovich Gridkovich Nevmyritsky, from near Kyiv (Berkovets). Some sources, however, cite Danylo's father as named Nicholas. There exist records of Nechai and Nevmyritsky families in Berkovets that show some relation between them (court cases, joint land holdings). Danylo's brothers include Ivan, Matwey (Matthew), and Yuri (Jurgis) who were all in the Cossack military. It is thought that Danylo's father was also a Cossack knight, and died when Danylo was very young. As for Danylo, he had at least two sons (Ivan and Yurii...one of whom perished in Siberia after being sent there by Catherine II of Russia, the other surviving in the Chernivtsi area) prior to fall 1647, with his wife, also named Anna.

Some historians claim that Nechai studied at the Kyiv-Mohyla Academy, which he graduated from in 1647, that is, at the age of 35. His attendance at the Academy was greatly encouraged by his grandfather Omelko, who campaigned with Petro Sahaidachny in the Black Sea region. According to other sources, in his youth, the traces of Danylo Nechai were seen in the Zaporozhian Sich and even among the Don Cossacks, where he comprehended the art of war. According to Cossack legends, Danylo Nechai was an associate of Pavel Pavlyuk-But, and Yakov Ostryanin, a twin of Ivan Bohun.

In response to Polish and Lithuanian aggressions and betrayals, Nechai participated in the rebellion led by Bogdan Khmelnytsky that sought to secure an independent Ukraine. This rebellion was against Polish overlords, their representatives and supporters (including the Catholic church and Jewish communities), and other vassals. In 1647 Nechai accompanied Bogdan Khmelnytsky to the Nikitin (Mikitinskaya) Sich. He participated in the capture of the Fortress of Kodak by the Cossacks, and in the battles of yellow waters, Korsun. He organized and led the Bratslav regiment. Then he became one of the associates of Maxim Krivonos, and distinguished himself in the battles in Vinnytsia, near Medzhybizh. (On July 20, 1648, Maksym Kryvonis led the slaughter of Medzhybizh 2,500 Jewish residents. The Jewish population in Medzhybizh was virtually eradicated, and there were no burials recorded for several years after 1648, consistent with the depopulation.) Nechai was honoured for his role in Medzhybizh, Zbarazh, and in the Battle of Zboriv in 1649, As a Bratslav colonel, he participated in the battles of Starokostiantyniv, and Pilyavtsy. The Polish memoirist S. Auschwitz in his "Diariusha" calls the Cossack leader Nechai "one of the most important among the rebels, a rebel to whom the Cossacks themselves gave the first place after Khmelnitsky." Contemporaries respectfully recognized his "extraordinary courage and intelligence". Colonel Danylo Nechai participated in the campaign of the Cossack army in Galicia, where, on behalf of Bogdan Khmelnitsky, he seized the castle in Brody and, together with other commanders, besieged Lviv, and stormed Zamost. After the liberation of Kyiv, from December 1648 he was in the rank of colonel. In the winter of 1649-1650 Danilo Nechai in Kyiv "repaired the military court over the Lyakhs". Then the detachment headed by him oversaught up near Fastiv a detachment of Polish nobles who fled with looted property, and dealt with them . Later, in Kyiv and Pereyaslav, Nechai negotiated with diplomats of the Commonwealth. 

He was opposed to the signing of the Treaty of Zboriv in 1649 by Bogdan Khmelnitsky as he believed it compromised the position of the Cossacks. The ramifications of the Treaty continue to this day...from the 3rd stanza of Pavlo Chubynski's patriotic poem "Glory and Freedom of Ukraine Has Not Yet Perished" (from which the (modified) 1st stanza and chorus form the Ukraine National Anthem): Oh Bohdan, Bohdan, Our great hetman What for did you give Ukraine To wretched muscovites?! To return her honor, We lay our heads We shall call ourselves Ukraine's Faithful sons!

Together with Matvey Gladky, Polkovnik (Полковник, Colonel) Nechai took Soroca and then, in September 1650, the then capital of Moldavia - Iaşi, forcing the Moldavian ruler Vasil Lupul to an alliance with Khmelnytsky. In 1651 he commanded the south-western front. While celebrating Shrovetide, he was surprise-attacked and died in battle with numerically superior Polish forces, led by Polish hetman Marcin Kalinowski, who stole the Nechai coat of arms/ made a copy and changed it. This matter was in the town of Krasne, in the Podil region. 

A granite obelisk was erected on his grave in 1954. Located northeast of town of Krasne in Vinnytsia Oblast. Geo co-ordinates 48°55'52.5"N 28°26'28.3"E Local lore purports that the hill on the grave was made by his loyal troops each carrying a hatful of soil to the site. Another legend purports that his body was carried to Kyiv and interred in a monastery. Yet another legend states that the Polish cut up his body and scattered it: presumably it was gathered by his loyal forces, and then buried...or possibly some/all carried to Kyiv or elsewhere. It is also postulated that this was a set of ancient Scythian Mounds that were filled in. It is noted in Soviet archives that prior to the obelisk being erected (circa 1951) there was an excavation carried out that found a single skeleton, but without a head. 

Thus perhaps the best theory as to where his body was buried is that he was beheaded after death (Historian Mykhailo Hrushevsky presents this theory, based on the account written by a Polish historian, who states that after a 3 day battle, Polish troops entered the church where Danylo's body was laid, killed the 4 priests and 1 monk present, and then took Danylo's head). The body was possibly also taken, but if so, it was rescued by loyal troops who then carried it to the existing Scythian mound complex and buried it within. As to where the head went there remain at least three theories: 1) taken by the Poles as a war trophy, 2) taken by loyal troops to a Kyiv monastery, or 3) presented as a gift (presumably by the Poles) to the Crimean Khan. That said, other scholars maintain that his body was, in fact, taken entirely to a Kyiv monastery. 

Nechai is Ukrainian folk hero and is often sung about in folk songs of the ideal Cossack knight. Second only to Khmelnitsky, he is a hero of Ukrainian independence and is honored to this day by an annual  procession to his burial mound (mohyla) on the date of his death.

External links 
Article on the Ukrainian Government Portal

Further reading

 Viacheslav Lypynsky. Participation of Nobility in the Great Ukrainian Revolution Under the Command of Hetman Bohdan Khmelnytsky /Collected works, vol. 2, Philadelphia, Pennsylvania 1980 (polish and Ukrainian bilingual text). 
 Яковенко Н.М. Українська шляхта з кiнця XIV до середини XVII столiття. Волинь i Центральна Україна, Київ 2008.
 Петровський М.Н. Визвольна війна українського народу проти гніту шляхетської Польщі і приєднання України до Росії (1648–1654), Київ 1939.
 Неча́й, Дани́ил - Новый Энциклопедический словарь Брокгауза и Ефрона, т.28
Annals of samovidets on newly discovered lists, Edited by O. I. Levitsky. — K., 1878. — p. 211-319

Reference

People from Bar, Ukraine
Zaporozhian Cossacks
Ruthenian nobility
1651 deaths
1612 births